Mad at the World is the first album from Christian rock band Mad at the World. It was significant for being one of the few Christian music albums to feature a synthpop sound.

History

In 1987 the band, consisting of Roger Rose, his brother Randy (who was only fifteen years old at the time) and their friend Mike Pendleton, released Mad at the World. The disc was unique in christian music for featuring a synthpop style of dance music heavily influenced by bands like Tears for Fears and especially Depeche Mode. This was at a time when the Christian music scene was dominated by Amy Grant and Stryper was breaking out. Roger's personal taste ran towards the sounds of Ultravox and Depeche Mode, a sound that no Christian band was playing at that time, prompting him to create the band and write the music. He attempted to "avoid church talk and cliche, (resulting) in some fresh, invigorating images."
Although not the best-selling album by the band, it is fondly remembered by many fans.

Although Daniel Amos released Vox Humana in 1983, it featured a more up-beat sound, more guitar and more acoustic drums, so this disc stands as one of the first truly synthpop albums in Christian music.

At 49 minutes and 13 seconds, this is the band's longest album.

Although Roger has stated that Mad at the World was the band's first and last disc not recorded entirely at Roger's home studio, the drum tracks for Through the Forest were recorded at Randy's studio, Rose Studios.

This album was reissued in 1999 by KMG Records on a "two-for-one" disc with Seasons of Love.

Influence of Depeche Mode
The heavy influence of Depeche Mode has been noted for this album. About this, Roger has responded, "I personally know plenty of people -- Christians -- who listen primarily to mainstream music because Christian music does not satisfy them musically. What Mad at the World is about is music that fills that kind of void, yet I feel it is lyrically uncompromising in its Christian message and values." He has also said, "Depeche Mode is probably my favorite group musically, but lyrically they are the most offensive, so dark and terribly depressing." His response was to write music answering the untruths which might affect young listeners, such as "Dry Your Tears" where he describes "a world where you see nothing everywhere" before singing "Close your eyes and pray/Heaven could be calling your name."

Track listing
All songs written by Roger Rose.
 "Living Dead" – 3:28
 "All the Lonely Sheep" – 5:50
 "I Want to See Heaven" – 4:25
 "No Room Left" – 4:05
 "Easy Way Out" – 3:50
 "Bad Motives" – 4:20
 "No More Innocence" – 5:50
 "It Can't Rain Forever" – 5:00
 "Here We Go Again" – 3:28
 "Dry Your Tears" – 4:10
 "Mad at the World" – 3:55
 "Chance of Luck" – 3:42

"No More Innocence" was re-recorded for the album Boomerang.

"Mad at the World" was re-recorded for the album Through the Forest.

Personnel
Roger Rose – lead vocals, keyboards, guitars, synthesizer programming, drum programming, percussion.
Randy Rose – vocals, drum programming, percussion.
Mike Pendleton – guitar, percussion.

Videos
Although no videos were filmed for this album, there is a concert video of the band performing "No More Innocence" dated from 1995. This was filmed after Mike Pendleton left the band and features Mike Link and Ben Jacobs.

References

1987 debut albums
Mad at the World albums